Avan Aval Adhu is a 1980 Indian Tamil-language film directed by Muktha Srinivasan and written by Visu. The film stars Sivakumar, Lakshmi, Sripriya and Thengai Srinivasan. Dealing with the then-groundbreaking issue of surrogate pregnancy, it is based on the story Oru Singam Muyalaagirathu by Sivasankari. The film was released on 11 April 1980.

Plot 

The film revolves around how Ramu's wife tries to conceal the surrogate mother of their child, who is a prostitute, from her husband. But the surrogate mother and her husband gets acquainted accidentally and their interactions grows towards unknown destiny behind the wife's knowledge. The strict and possessive wife in the end gets a child she had always longed for only to lose her husband's undivided love and attention.

Cast 
Sivakumar as Ramu
Lakshmi as Lavanya
Sripriya as Menaka
Thengai Srinivasan
Manorama as Muniyamma
Y. G. Mahendran
Kathadi Ramamurthy
Typist Gopu
Gundu Kalyanam

Soundtrack 
The music was composed by M. S. Viswanathan. Lyrics written by Kannadasan.

Reception 
Despite being significantly different from the source material, the film was well received critically and commercially. Kanthan of Kalki praised the film for the morals it was propagating.

References

External links 
 

1980 films
1980s Tamil-language films
Films about surrogacy
Films based on Indian novels
Films directed by Muktha Srinivasan
Films scored by M. S. Viswanathan
Films with screenplays by Visu
Indian pregnancy films